Mayan Oliver (born 11 July 1993) is a Mexican modern pentathlete. She competed in the women's event at the 2020 Summer Olympics.

References

External links
 

1993 births
Living people
Mexican female modern pentathletes
Modern pentathletes at the 2020 Summer Olympics
Olympic modern pentathletes of Mexico
Pan American Games competitors for Mexico
Modern pentathletes at the 2019 Pan American Games
Sportspeople from the State of Mexico
People from Cuautitlán
Pan American Games medalists in modern pentathlon
Modern pentathletes at the 2015 Pan American Games
Pan American Games bronze medalists for Mexico
21st-century Mexican women
Central American and Caribbean Games gold medalists for Mexico
Central American and Caribbean Games medalists in modern pentathlon
Competitors at the 2018 Central American and Caribbean Games
World Modern Pentathlon Championships medalists
Medalists at the 2015 Pan American Games